Central Asia and Ancient India have long traditions of social-cultural, religious, political and economic contact since remote antiquity. The two regions have common and contiguous borders, climatic continuity, similar geographical features and geo-cultural affinity. For millennia, there has been a flow of people, material and ideas between the two.

Migrations

In classical Indian tradition clans of the Shakas, Yavanas, Kambojas, Pahlavas, Paradas and others are also attested to have been coming as invaders and that they were all finally absorbed into the community of Kshatriyas.

Chinese author Ma-twan-lin writes that, "The nomenclature of the early Sakas in India shows an admixture of Scythian, Parthian and Iranian elements. In India the Scythians soon adapted themselves to their new environs and began to adopt Indian names and religious beliefs."

Central Asian people in ancient Indian literature

Atharvaveda
Atharvaveda refers to Gandhari, Mujavat and Bahlika from north-west (Central Asia). Gandharis were from Gandhara, the Bahlikas are Bactrians, Mujavat (land of Soma) refer to Hindukush–Pamirs (the Kamboja region) and possibly the Muztagh Ata mountain.

The post-Vedic Atharvaveda-Parisista (Ed Bolling & Negelein) makes first direct reference to the Kambojas (verse 57.2.5). It also juxtaposes the Kambojas, Bahlikas and Gandharas.

Sama Veda
The Vamsa Brahmana of the Sama Veda refers to Madrakara Shaungayani as the teacher of Aupamanyava Kamboja. Sage Shangayani Madrakara, as his name itself shows, and as the scholars have rightly pointed out, belonged to the Madra people.

Professor Jean Przyluski has shown that Bahlika (Balkh) was an Iranian settlement of the Madras who were known as Bahlika-Uttaramadras i.e. the northern Madras, living in Bahlika or Bactria country. These Bahlika Uttara Madras are the Uttara Madras of the Aitareya Brahamana.

This connection between the Uttara Madras and the Kambojas is said to be natural because they were close neighbours in the north-west.

Manusmriti
Manusmriti asserts that the Kambojas, Sakas, Yavanas, Paradas, Pahlavas, etc., had been Kshatriyas of good birth but were gradually degraded to the barbaric status due to their not following the Brahmanas and the Brahmanical code of conduct.

The Silk road route through which erstwhile Hindu Vedic societies became partially Buddhists as well as the Hindu names and history of these kingdoms lend credence to this idea. Furthermore, almost invariably, the royal clans of Central Asia and Northwestern India claimed descent from historical Hindu royalties and royal lines such as Suryavanshi and Chandravanshi. Many of these kings and nobilities often claimed direct descent from Lord Rama and Pandavas to strengthen their claim to throne.

Puranas
The Haihaya Yadavas are the first known invaders in the recorded history of the sub-continent. Described in the Puranas as allying with four other groups, the invaders were eventually defeated and assimilated into the local community under different castes from Kshatriyas to Shudras. Alberuni refers to this description, saying that the "five hordes" belonged to his own people, i.e. Central Asia.

The Puranic Bhuvanakosha attests that Bahlika or Bactria was the northernmost Puranic Janapada of ancient India and was located in Udichya or Uttarapatha division of Indian sub-continent. The Uttarapatha or northern division of Jambudvipa comprised an area of Central Asia from the Urals and the Caspian Sea to the Yenisei and from Turkistan and Tien Shan ranges to the Arctic (Dr S. M. Ali).

Kavyamimamsa of Rajashekhara
The 10th century CE Kavyamimamsa of Pandit Rajashekhara knew about the existence of several Central Asian tribes. He furnishes an exhaustive list of the extant tribes of his times and places the Shakas, Tusharas, Vokanas, Hunas, Kambojas, Vahlika, Vahlava, Tangana, Limpaka, Turushka and others together, styling them all as the tribes from Uttarapatha or north division.

See also
 Buddhism in Central Asia
 Hinduism in Armenia
 Indo-Scythians
 Indo-Parthian Kingdom
 Uttarakuru
 Kuru Kingdom

References

Books and periodicals
 Ancient Kamboja, People and the Country, 1981, Dr Kamboj
 Political History of Ancient India, 1996, Dr H. C. Raychaudhury
 India and Central Asia, 1955, Dr P. C., Bagchi.

Human migration
India
Historiography of Afghanistan
Historiography of Pakistan
Foreign relations of ancient India